Ain Ez Zayt   is a  town in Akkar Governorate, Lebanon, close to the border with Syria.

The population in Ain Ez Zayt and nearby  Kfar El Ftouh are mostly Sunni Muslim or Alawite.

History
In 1838, Eli Smith noted  the village as 'Ain ez-Zeit,  whose inhabitants were Alawites, located east of esh-Sheikh Mohammed.

References

Bibliography

External links
Ain Ez Zayt, Localiban 

Populated places in Akkar District
Sunni Muslim communities in Lebanon